The Santa Marta foliage-gleaner (Clibanornis rufipectus) is a species of bird in the family Furnariidae. It is endemic to Sierra Nevada de Santa Marta in Colombia. It was formerly considered a subspecies of the ruddy foliage-gleaner. Evidence suggests that it possibly should be moved to the genus Hylocryptus.

References

Santa Marta foliage-gleaner
Birds of the Sierra Nevada de Santa Marta
Endemic birds of Colombia
Near threatened animals
Near threatened biota of South America
Santa Marta foliage-gleaner